Elam Abocha Singh (born 10 October 1992 in Manipur) is an Indian professional footballer who plays as a midfielder for Rangdajied United F.C. in the I-League.

Career
Singh made his professional debut in the I-League for Rangdajied United F.C. on 22 September 2013 against Prayag United S.C. at the Salt Lake Stadium in which he started and played the full match as Rangdajied United lost 0–2.

Career statistics

References

External links 
 I-League Profile

1992 births
Living people

Indian footballers
Rangdajied United F.C. players
Association football midfielders
Footballers from Manipur
I-League players